Zenith Classic Rock is an independent regional radio station in Ireland broadcasting from Kilkenny. It is owned by Andy Linton of Total Broadcast Consultants Ltd. and airs a Classic rock format, targeting an adult audience.

The station can also be heard on shortwave.

Other stations run by the same organisation are Harmony Beautiful Music, and Rebel Ska and Reggae.

Zenith Classic Rock is one of Ireland's oldest internet stations. It has been airing on terrestrial radio since 2010 and DAB since 2013.

References

External links
Official Website

Mass media in Waterford (city)
Radio stations in the Republic of Ireland